Valdôtain (local dialect: Valdotèn, Valdŏtèn, Valdouhtan) is a dialect of Arpitan (Franco-Provençal) spoken in the Aosta Valley in Italy, and the official and common language of the Aosta Valley. It is commonly known as patois or patoué.

Diffusion 
The Aosta Valley represents nowadays the only region of the Franco-Provençal area where this language is still widely spoken as native by all age ranges of the population.

Vocabulary examples
Several subdialects of Valdôtain exist that exhibit unique features in terms of phonetics and vocabulary.

Linguistic studies
Valdôtain has been the subject of detailed study at the Bureau régional pour l'ethnologie et la linguistique (BREL) in Aosta as well as in the Centre d'études francoprovençales in Saint-Nicolas.

Music
The main modern singers and songwriters in Valdôtain are:
Louis de Jyaryot, from Ayas;
Maura Susanna, from Saint-Vincent;
Magui Bétemps, from Valtournenche.

The traditional Aostan songs in Valdôtain and in French form the core of the activity of the band Trouveur valdotèn.

Poetry 
Here is a selection of some of the most important poets in Valdôtain:

References

Bibliography 
  Jules Brocherel, Le Patois et la langue française en Vallée d'Aoste éd. V. Attinger, Neuchâtel
  Aimé Chenal, Le franco-provençal valdotain. Morphologie et Syntaxe, Aoste, Musumeci éditeur, 1986,  
  Alexis Bétemps, La langue française en Vallée d'Aoste de 1945 à nos jours, Milan, T.D.L., 
  Hans-Erich Keller, Études linguistiques sur les parlers valdôtains, éd. A. Francke S.A., Berne, 1958. 
  Ernest Schüle, Histoire linguistique de la Vallée d’Aoste, dans "Bulletin du Centre d’études francoprovençales" n° 22, Imprimerie Valdôtaine, Aoste, 1990. 
  Xavier Favre, Histoire linguistique de la Vallée d’Aoste, dans "Espace, temps et culture en Vallée d’Aoste", Imprimerie Valdôtaine, Aoste, 1996. 
  François-Gabriel Frutaz, Les origines de la langue française en Vallée d’Aoste, Imprimerie Marguerettaz, Aoste, 1913. 
  Édouard Bérard, La langue française dans la Vallée d’Aoste, Aoste, 1861. 
  Alexis Bétemps, Les Valdôtains et leur langue, préface de Henri Armand, Imprimerie Duc, Aoste, 1979. 
  Alexis Bétemps, Le bilinguisme en Vallée d’Aoste : problèmes et perspectives, dans "Les minorités ethniques en Europe", par les soins de A.-L. Sanguin, l’Harmattan, Paris, 1993, pages 131-135.
  Bétemps, Alexis, Le francoprovençal en Vallée d’Aoste. Problèmes et prospectives, dans Lingua e comunicazione simbolica nella cultura walser, VI. Walsertreffen (6ème rencontre des Walsers), Fondazione Monti, Ausola d’Assola, 1989, p. 355-372

See also
Aostan French
Languages of Italy

Franco-Provençal language
Languages of Aosta Valley
Languages of Italy
Arpitania